The Living and the Dead is a 2006 British drama film written and directed by Simon Rumley, starring Leo Bill, Kate Fahy and Roger Lloyd-Pack.

Plot
Donald Brocklebank (Roger Lloyd Pack) is a man of aristocratic background living in fear of bankruptcy in a country manor house. His wife, Nancy (Kate Fahy), is terminally ill and requires constant care, as does his schizophrenic son James (Leo Bill).

When Donald leaves the two alone in a bid to solve their almost definite financial collapse, James's condition begins to worsen. He believes he is able to look after his sick mother rather than nurse Mary (Sarah Ball) who was sent by Donald. He neglects taking his prescribed medicine and locks the nurse out of the house, leaving his mother with nothing to do but weep. James, believing that more medicine will make you better faster than the prescribed amount, force feeds his mother large quantities of her pills, nearly killing her.

Eventually, police make their way into the house, relieving Nancy of her son's care. Due to the medication overdose she has an emergency operation which seems to cure her of her ailments. James then goes on to begin hallucinating from not taking his medication, while Nancy recovers from her illness. In a fit of rage, James stabs his mother to death, before stabbing and wounding his father. Shortly before Nancy's funeral, Donald passionately supports his son, provoking hostility from the rest of the family. At the funeral, James believes he has seen his mother and rushes over to hug her. In James' eyes, she then stabs her son several times, though everyone else sees James taking the knife he killed his mother with into his own stomach.

The film ends with Donald apparently bearing the same condition as his son, being cared for in his own home. He stabs one of the nurses and is taken away.

Cast
Leo Bill as James Brocklebank
Roger Lloyd-Pack as Donald Brocklebank (as Roger Lloyd Pack)
Kate Fahy as Nancy Brocklebank
Sarah Ball as Nurse Mary
Neil Conrich as Policeman
Richard Wills-Cotton as nurse Mike
Alan Perrin as Nurse Bob
Richard Syms as Vicar
Hilary Hodsman as Auntie Pat

Reception
Critical reception for The Living and the Dead was mostly positive, and on review aggregator Rotten Tomatoes the film holds an approval rating of 91% based on 11 reviews.

Awards
Fantastic Fest Jury Award for Best Actor at the Fantastic Fest (2006, won - Leo Bill)
Fantastic Fest Jury Award for Best Director at the Fantastic Fest (2006, won)
Fantastic Fest Jury Award for Best Make-Up at the Fantastic Fest (2006, won)
Fantastic Fest Jury Award for Best Picture at the Fantastic Fest (2006, won)
Fantastic Fest Jury Award for Best Supporting Actress at the Fantastic Fest (2006, won - Kate Fahy)

References

External links

2006 films
2006 horror films
2000s psychological drama films
2006 independent films
2006 psychological thriller films
British drama films
British horror films
British thriller films
British independent films
Films about dysfunctional families
Films set in country houses
2000s psychological horror films
2006 drama films
2000s English-language films
2000s British films